White Americans are Americans who identify as white people. This group constitutes the majority of the people in the United States. According to the 2020 census, 61.6%, or 204,277,273 people, were white alone. This represented a national white demographic decline from a 72.4% share of the U.S.'s population (white alone) in 2010.

As of July 1, 2021, United States Census Bureau estimates that 75.8% of the US population were white alone, while Non-Hispanic whites were 59.3% of the population. White Hispanic and Latino Americans totaled about 12,579,626, or 3.8% of the population. European Americans are the largest panethnic group of white Americans and have constituted the majority population of the United States since the nation's founding.

The U.S. Census Bureau uses a particular definition of "white" that differs from some colloquial uses of the term. The Bureau defines "White" people to be those "having origins in any of the original peoples of Europe, the Middle East or North Africa." Within official census definitions, people of all racial categories may be further divided into those who identify as "not Hispanic or Latino" and those who do identify as "Hispanic or Latino". The term "non-Hispanic white," rather than just "white," may be the census group corresponding most closely to those persons who identify as and are perceived to be white in common usage; similarly not all Hispanic/Latino people identify as "white," "black," or any other listed racial category. In 2015, the Census Bureau announced their intention to make Hispanic/Latino a racial category similar to "white" or "black," with respondents able to choose one, two, or more racial categories; this change was cancelled during the Trump administration. Other persons who are classified as "white" by the U.S. census but may or may not identify as or be perceived as white include Arab Americans and Jewish Americans. In the United States, the term White people generally denotes a person of European ancestry, but has been legally extended to people of West Asian and North African (Middle Eastern, West Asian, and North African) ancestry.

The most commonly reported ancestries of non-Hispanic White Americans include German (13%), Irish (12%), English (9%), Italian (6%), French (4%), Polish (3%), Scottish (3%), Scotch-Irish (2%), and Dutch, Norwegian, Swedish, and Russian, each (1%) respectively. It is difficult to track ancestry from Spain in Whites alone since people of Spanish descent are Hispanic and though the census does track Hispanics' national origin, it does not classify it by race. In 2021, 995,583 people of any race claimed ancestry from Spain, 0.3% of the total population. The British Americans' demography is considered a serious under-count as the stock tend to self-report and identify as simply "Americans" (7%), due to the length of time they have inhabited the United States, particularly if their family arrived prior to the American Revolution. The vast majority of white Americans also have ancestry from multiple countries.

Historical and present definitions 

Definitions of who is "White" have changed throughout the history of the United States.

U.S. census definition 
The term "white American" can encompass many different ethnic groups. Although the United States census purports to reflect a social definition of race, the social dimensions of race are more complex than Census criteria. The 2000 U.S. census states that racial categories "generally reflect a social definition of race recognized in this country. They do not conform to any biological, anthropological or genetic criteria."

The Census question on race lists the categories White or European American, Black or African American, American Indian and Alaska Native, Native Hawaiian or Other Pacific Islander, Asian, plus "Some other race", with the respondent having the ability to mark more than one racial or ethnic category. The Census Bureau defines White people as follows:

"White" refers to a person having origins in any of the original peoples of Europe, the Middle East or North Africa. It includes people who indicated their race(s) as "White" or reported entries such as  German,
Italian, Lebanese, Arab, Moroccan, or Caucasian.

In U.S. census documents, the designation White overlaps, as do all other official racial categories, with the term Hispanic or Latino, which was introduced in the 1980 census as a category of ethnicity, separate and independent of race. Hispanic and Latino Americans as a whole make up a racially diverse group and as a whole are the largest minority in the country.

From 1850 to 1920, the U.S. census form did not distinguish between whites and Mexican Americans. In the 1940 and 1950 census the instructions were to mark Mexicans with a ‘W’ for white. In the 2020 census as well, a write-in of “Mexican” was coded as White.

The characterization of Middle Eastern and North African Americans as white has been a matter of controversy. In the early 20th century, there were a number of cases where people of Arab descent were denied entry into the United States or deported, because they were characterized as nonwhite. In 1944, the law changed, and Middle Eastern and North African peoples were granted white status. In 2015, the U.S. census endorsed the idea of creating a separate racial category for Middle Eastern and North African Americans in the 2020 census, but this plan was cancelled during the Trump administration.

In cases where individuals do not self-identify, the U.S. census parameters for race give each national origin a racial value.

Additionally, people who reported Muslim (or a sect of Islam such as Shia or Sunni), Jewish, Zoroastrian, Mexican or Caucasian as their "race" in the "Some other race" section, without noting a country of origin, are automatically tallied as White. The US Census considers the write-in response of "Caucasian" or "Aryan" to be a synonym for White in their ancestry code listing.

Social definition 
In the contemporary United States, essentially anyone of European descent is considered White. However, many of the non-European ethnic groups classified as White by the U.S. Census, such as Arab Americans, Jewish Americans, and even European-derived  Hispanics and Latinos may not identify as, and may not be perceived to be, white.

The definition of White has changed significantly over the course of American history. Among Europeans, those not considered White at some point in American history include Italians, Greeks, Germans, Spaniards, Irish, Finns, and Russians. Early on in the United States, membership in the white race was generally limited to those of British, Nordic ancestry, and sometimes Germanic origin.

David R. Roediger argues that the construction of the white race in the United States was an effort to mentally distance slave owners from slaves. The process of officially being defined as white by law often came about in court disputes over pursuit of citizenship.

Critical race theory definition 

Critical race theory developed in the 1970s and 1980s, influenced by the language of critical legal studies, which challenged concepts such as objective truth, rationality and judicial neutrality, and by critical theory. Academics and activists disillusioned with the outcomes of the civil rights movement pointed out that though African Americans supposedly enjoyed legal equality, white Americans continued to hold disproportionate power and still had superior living standards. Liberal ideas such as meritocracy and equal opportunity, they argued, hid and reinforced deep structural inequalities and thus serves the interests of a white elite. Critical race theorists see racism as embedded in public attitudes and institutions, and highlight institutional racism and unconscious biases. Legal scholar Derrick Bell advanced the interest convergence principle, which suggests that whites support minority rights only when doing so is also in their self-interest.

As Whites, especially White Anglo-Saxon Protestants, or WASPs, are the dominant racial and cultural group, according to sociologist Steven Seidman, writing from a critical theory perspective, "White culture constitutes the general cultural mainstream, causing non-White culture to be seen as deviant, in either a positive or negative manner. Moreover, Whites tend to be disproportionately represented in powerful positions, controlling almost all political, economic, and cultural institutions."

Yet, according to Seidman, Whites are most commonly unaware of their privilege and the manner in which their culture has always been dominant in the US, as they do not identify as members of a specific racial group but rather incorrectly perceive their views and culture as "raceless", when in fact it is ethno-national (ethnic/cultural) specific, with a racial base component.

Demographic information 

The fifty states, the District of Columbia, and Puerto Rico as of the 2020 United States Census

White Americans constitute the majority of the 332 million people living in the United States, with 61.6% of the population in the 2020 United States Census. This represented a national white demographic decline from a 72.4% share of the US's self-identified 'white alone' population in 2010.

The largest ethnic groups (by ancestry) among White Americans were Germans, followed by Irish and English. In the 1980 census 49,598,035 Americans cited that they were of English ancestry, making them 26% of the country and the largest group at the time, and in fact larger than the population of England itself. Slightly more than half of these people would cite that they were of "American" ancestry on subsequent censuses and virtually everywhere that "American" ancestry predominates on the 2000 census corresponds to places where "English" predominated on the 1980 census.

Geographic distribution 

White Americans are the majority racial group in almost all of the United States. They are not the majority in Hawaii, many American Indian reservations, parts of the South, the District of Columbia, all US territories, and in many urban areas throughout the country.
Overall the highest concentration of those referred to as "non-Hispanic whites" by the Census Bureau are found in the Midwest, New England, the northern Rocky Mountain states, Kentucky, West Virginia, and East Tennessee. The lowest concentration of whites was found in southern and mid-Atlantic states.

Although all large geographical areas are dominated by White Americans, much larger differences can be seen between specific parts of large cities.

States with the highest percentages of White Americans, either White Alone or in combination with another race as of 2020:
 Vermont 95.6%
 Maine 95.4%
 West Virginia 94.4%
 New Hampshire 93.7%
 Wyoming 92.0%
 Montana 90.9%
 Idaho 90.2%
 Iowa 89.8%
 North Dakota 88.0%
 Kentucky 87.5%
States with the highest percentages of non-Latino/Hispanic whites, as of 2020:
 Maine 92.0%
 Vermont 91.3%
 New Hampshire 91.3%
 West Virginia 90.4%
 Wyoming 90.7%
 Idaho 90.7%
 Utah 88.7%
 Iowa 88.7%
 Montana 86.7%
 Nebraska 86.0%

Income and educational attainment 

White Americans have the second highest median household income and personal income levels in the nation, by cultural background. The median income per household member was also the highest, since White Americans had the smallest households of any racial demographic in the nation. In 2006, the median individual income of a White American age 25 or older was $33,030, with those who were full-time employed, and of age 25 to 64, earning $34,432. Since 42% of all households had two income earners, the median household income was considerably higher than the median personal income, which was $48,554 in 2005. Jewish Americans rank first in household income, personal income, and educational attainment among White Americans. In 2005, White households had a median household income of $48,977, which is 10% above the national median of $44,389. Among Cuban Americans, with 86% classified as White, those born in the US have a higher median income and educational attainment level than most other Whites.

The poverty rates for White Americans are the second-lowest of any racial group, with 11% of white individuals living below the poverty line, 3% lower than the national average. However, due to Whites' majority status, 48% of Americans living in poverty are white.

White Americans' educational attainment is the second-highest in the country, after Asian Americans'. Overall, nearly one-third of White Americans had a Bachelor's degree, with the educational attainment for Whites being higher for those born outside the United States: 38% of foreign born, and 30% of native born Whites had a college degree. Both figures are above the national average of 27%.

Gender income inequality was the greatest among Whites, with White men outearning White women by 48%. Census Bureau data for 2005 reveals that the median income of White females was lower than that of males of all races. In 2005, the median income for White American females was only slightly higher than that of African American females.

White Americans are more likely to live in suburbs and small cities than their black counterparts.

Population by state

White Americans of one race or alone from 2000 to 2020

Non-Hispanic population

Politics 
White Americans tend to vote for the Republican Party ever since the 1960s when the party pushed for the Southern strategy electoral strategy to increase political support among white voters in the South.

In 2012, 88% of Romney voters were white while 56% of Obama voters were white. In the 2008 presidential election, John McCain won 55% of white votes. In the 2010 House election, Republicans won 60% of the white votes.

Some academics and commentators have argued that Donald Trump's presidential election victory in 2016 is an example of "White backlash".

Culture 
From their earliest presence in North America, White Americans have contributed literature, art, cinema, religion, agricultural skills, foods, science and technology, fashion and clothing styles, music, language, legal system, political system, and social and technological innovation to American culture. White American culture derived its earliest influences from English, Scottish, Welsh, and Irish settlers and is quantitatively the largest proportion of American culture. The overall American culture reflects White American culture. The culture has been developing since long before the United States formed a separate country. Much of White American culture shows influences from British culture. Colonial ties to Great Britain spread the English language, legal system and other cultural attributes.

Albion's Seed: Four British Folkways in America 

In his 1989 book Albion's Seed: Four British Folkways in America, David Hackett Fischer explores the details of the folkways of four groups of settlers from the British Isles that moved to the American colonies during the 17th and 18th centuries from distinct regions of Britain and Ireland. His thesis is that the culture of each group persisted (albeit in modified form), providing the basis for the modern United States.

According to Fischer, the foundation of America's four regional cultures was formed from four mass migrations from four regions of the British Isles by four distinct ethno-cultural groups. New England's formative period occurred between 1629 and 1640 when Puritans, mostly from East Anglia, settled there, thus forming the basis for the New England regional culture. The next mass migration was of southern English Cavaliers and their working class English servants to the Chesapeake Bay region between 1640 and 1675. This spawned the creation of the American Southern culture.

Then, between 1675 and 1725, thousands of Irish, Cornish, English and Welsh Quakers plus many Germans sympathetic to Quaker ideas, led by William Penn, settled the Delaware Valley. This resulted in the formation of the General American culture, although, according to Fischer, this is really a "regional culture", even if it does today encompass most of the U.S. from the mid-Atlantic states to the Pacific Coast. Finally, a huge number of settlers from the borderlands between England and Scotland, sometimes by way of northern Ireland, migrated to Appalachia between 1717 and 1775. This resulted in the formation of the Upland South regional culture, which has since expanded to the west to West Texas and parts of the American Southwest.

In his book, Fischer brings up several points. He states that the U.S. is not a country with one "general" culture and several "regional" cultures, as is commonly thought. Rather, there are only four regional cultures as described above, and understanding this helps one to more clearly understand American history as well as contemporary American life. Fischer asserts that it is not only important to understand where different groups came from, but when. All population groups have, at different times, their own unique set of beliefs, fears, hopes and prejudices. When different groups moved to America and brought certain beliefs and values with them, these ideas became, according to Fischer, more or less frozen in time, even if they eventually changed in their original place of origin.

Admixture

Admixture in non-Hispanic whites 
White Americans (European Americans) on average are: 98.6 percent European, 0.19 percent African and 0.18 percent Native American. Inferred British/Irish ancestry is found in European Americans from all states at mean proportions of
above 20%, and represents a majority of ancestry, above 50% mean proportion, in states such
as Mississippi, Arkansas, and Tennessee. Scandinavian
ancestry in European Americans is highly localized; most states show only trace mean
proportions of Scandinavian ancestry, while it comprises a significant proportion, upwards of
10%, of ancestry in European Americans from Minnesota and the Dakotas.

DNA analysis on White Americans by geneticist Mark D. Shriver showed an average of 0.7% Sub-Saharan African admixture and 3.2% Native American admixture. The same author, in another study, claimed that about 30% of all White Americans, approximately 66 million people, have a median of 2.3% of Black African admixture. Shriver discovered his ancestry is 10 percent African, and Shriver's partner in DNA Print Genomics, J.T. Frudacas, contradicted him two years later stating "Five percent of European Americans exhibit some detectable level of African ancestry."

Older studies have also been performed. In a 2007 study, Gonçalves et al. reported Sub-Saharan and Amerindian mtDNA lineages at a frequency of 3.1% (respectively 0.9% and 2.2%) in a sample of 1387 American Caucasians as compared to 62% in white Brazilians (respectively 29% and 33%), 98% for white Colombians (respectively 8% and 90%) and similarly high levels for Argentines, Chileans, and Costa Ricans. A 2003 study on Y-chromosomes and mtDNA found African admixture in European-Americans to be "below the limits of detection".

Admixture in Hispanic whites 
In contrast to non-Hispanic or Latino whites, whose average European ancestry is 98.6%, genetic research has found that the average European admixture among White Hispanic and Latino Americans is 73%, while the average European admixture for Hispanic Americans overall (regardless of their self-identified race) is 65.1%.

See also 

 American ancestry
 Anglo
 Emigration from Europe
 European Americans
 Hyphenated American
 Middle Eastern Americans
 Non-Hispanic or Latino whites
 Race and ethnicity in the United States
 Stereotypes of white Americans
 White Anglo-Saxon Protestant
 White ethnic
 White Latino Americans
 White Southerners
 List of United States cities by percentage of white population
 White Americans in California

Notes

References

External links 
 White Population 2000 from the US Census

 
 
Ethnic groups in the United States